is an anime series produced by Group TAC, loosely based on the 1994 fighting game Super Street Fighter II Turbo. Directed by Gisaburo Sugii (who also directed the earlier Street Fighter II: The Animated Movie), the series first aired in Japan in 1995, from 10 April to 27 November, on YTV.

Premise 

The series chronicles the adventures of Ryu and Ken, two teenage martial artists who embark on a journey to improve their skills after experiencing brutal defeat at the hands of Guile. Along the way, they become acquainted with other Street Fighter characters such as the 15-year-old tour guide Chun-Li, martial arts movie-star Fei Long, Muay Thai champion Sagat, and Indian monk Dhalsim. Eventually, they find themselves in the crosshairs of the criminal syndicate Shadowlaw, led by the enigmatic M. Bison, after defeating one of their subordinate organizations (Ashura). Among the agents of Shadowlaw include Russian bear wrestler and hired muscle Zangief, seductive British assassin Cammy (who is unaware of her employer's connection to Shadowlaw), and Interpol double agent Balrog. The Spanish nobleman Vega also appears as an antagonist, although he is not connected with Shadowlaw in this series.

In contrast to Street Fighter II: The Animated Movie, which hewed very closely to the original game's storyline, Street Fighter II V takes a number of liberties with its source material. It features radically redesigned versions of most of the game's characters, whose appearances, backstories, and personalities deviated greatly from their traditional depictions. While the show was set in 1995, the present year of its original airing, the ages of the characters were altered to make most of the cast younger than they were in the games (for example, Ryu's year of birth was changed from 1964 to 1977). Out of the seventeen characters featured in Super Street Fighter II Turbo (the latest game in the series at the time), only Blanka, Dee Jay, E. Honda, and T. Hawk never appear in the show. 

Akuma makes several cameo appearances during crowd scenes, but he is not actively involved in the story.

Characters 

Street Fighters
 Ryu
 Voiced by Kouji Tsujitani in Japan, Brett Weaver and Tommy Drake in the English ADV dub and Skip Stellrecht in the English Animaze dub.
Ryu is the main protagonist. He is a young martial artist who is extremely dedicated to the lifestyle of martial arts and is always trying to improve his fighting skills. He was raised in the Japanese countryside, on the fictional island of Mikuni. His best friend and sparring partner is Ken Masters, with whom he has trained in the same dojo since childhood. Ryu and Ken are attacked by Guile's soldiers after Ken flirts with one of the women accompanying them. Although they defeat the soldiers, Guile himself shows up and beats Ryu and Ken. The encounter with Guile humbles and inspires them to go on a journey to improve their martial arts skills, in the hopes of challenging Guile to a rematch. During their travels, Ryu learns how to use a Chinese ki-based power called Hadōkō in the form of the Hadouken, as well as mastering another move called the Tatsumaki Senpukyaku. Unlike his in-game counterpart, Ryu wears prayer beads on his left hand and has short spiky hair. Additionally, the stern and stoic personality he exhibits in the games is replaced with a more giddy, upbeat personality; simple-minded, but always on the lookout for a good challenge.
 Ken
 Voiced by Kenji Haga in Japan, Jason Douglas in the English ADV dub, and Stephen Apostolina in the English Animaze dub.
Ken is Ryu's best friend and the only son of the extremely rich Masters family. He lives in San Francisco with his parents (a Caucasian-American father and Japanese mother) in a large mansion. Ken's personality and backstory are mostly unchanged from the original game. He loves to show off and be a womanizer. Unlike his in-game counterpart; Ken has red hair similar to the Street Fighter cartoon. He is a teenager. Eventually, Ken learns to use the power of Hadōkō while being held captive by Shadowlaw. Ken and Ryu have both mastered the Shoryuken, as Ken takes it one step further, by later empowering the Shoryuken to the Hado Shoryuken, and then shortens it to the Hadou Shoryu. In the English dub, Ken still calls the move the Shoryuken while Ryu calls it by its English translation.
 Guile
 Voiced by Tesshō Genda in Japan, Rob Mungle in the English ADV dub, and Kirk Thornton in the English Animaze dub.
Guile is a Sergeant in the United States Air Force, stationed in San Francisco. He takes pride in both the Air Force and his men and goes out drinking with them whenever he can. He and his partner, Nash, have served together for many years. He regularly works out and lifts weights, and has won at least one boxing tournament. Compared to his game counterpart, Guile's hairstyle went from being a flat-top, into a crew-cut fade, and he traded his army green tank-top and forest-camouflage cargo fatigues for a navy blue tank-top and cargo-fatigues; he also does not have a wife and daughter. The martial arts style that he uses is loosely based on US Military Combatives. Much like his live-action counterpart from Street Fighter, Guile has no ki-force and only uses a powerless version of his signature Flash Kick and carries weapons and artillery. Following his bar encounter with Ryu and Ken, Guile is not seen again until the second half of the series, after Ken, Ryu, and Chun-Li are kidnapped by Shadowlaw, and Guile is sent on a mission to rescue them. After seeing Ryu and Ken defeat Bison, Guile is impressed and respects the two.
 Chun-Li
 Voiced by Chisa Yokoyama in Japan, Tamara Lo and Junie Hoang in the English ADV dub, and Lia Sargent in the English Animaze dub.
Chun-Li is a tour guide hired by Ken and Ryu upon their arrival in Hong Kong. She is also the daughter of Dorai, the top inspector for the Hong Kong police. Her father trains her in kung fu, both as self-defense and as part of her rearing. Like Ken, Chun-Li comes from an extremely wealthy, privileged background, although she is much friendlier and more humble than Ken. She accompanies the pair throughout their journeys across Asia and Europe but rarely engages in combat unless personally attacked or threatened. Ken becomes smitten with her to the point where he takes her on a shopping spree and buys her an expensive ring and clothes from fashion houses such as Chanel, Hermes, Gucci, and jewelry from Tiffany's. It is never revealed if she reciprocates his feelings. Chun-Li appears to be 10 years younger than her game counterpart and she is not seen in her blue mini-qipao and white boots until the final season, where she is captive at Bison's base. Changes to this outfit include the absence of her hair-bun covers, as well as her pantyhose being replaced with kneepads. The only signature move that Chun Li uses from the game is her Yosokyaku.
 Fei Long
 Voiced by Kazuki Yao in Japan, Andrew Klimko in the English ADV dub, and Randy McPherson in the English Animaze dub.
One of Dorai's best students, Fei Long is an up-and-coming martial arts movie star whose insistence on "making the fight real" results in damaged props and public property as well as injuries to the stunt doubles. Ken Masters volunteers to be his opponent in a fight scene while touring Hong Kong with Ryu and Chun-Li, but the destruction caused by the fight forces the director to halt the filming. Upon learning of his master's supposed death, he becomes distraught with grief and seeks to avenge him. While visiting the hospital where Dorai is staying, the Chief of Interpol informs Fei Long of the charade. Fei Long identifies Balrog as the Shadowlaw operative who ordered the hit on Dorai, with the assistance of Cammy (after a fight with her in Dorai's hospital quarters). The only move Fei Long uses from the game is his En Geki Shu which was simply a basic attack in the game and made into a special move in this anime.
 Sagat
 Voiced by Banjō Ginga in Japan, Andrew Klimko in the ADV dub, and Peter Spellos in the English Animaze dub.
Sagat was the "King of Muay Thai", one of the most vicious forms of martial arts in the world. When he fought professionally, he was the champion of Thailand and was known simply as "Champ". After refusing to participate in a match for the Ashura syndicate, he is framed for selling drugs. One of the Ashura syndicate's men plants heroin in Ryu's luggage at the airport in Bangkok, leading to Ryu's imprisonment in the same facility as Sagat. The two of them gain each other's respect and learn more about the Ashura. After the Ashura kingpin is arrested, evidence of Sagat's innocence is discovered by Thai police and he is released from prison. In contrast to his video game counterpart, Sagat does not work for Shadowlaw, still has both of his eyes, and lacks a chest scar. Thus, his rivalry with Ryu is more of a friendly one, and not based on any prior resentment. The only move Sagat uses from the game is his Tiger Knee.
 Dhalsim
 Voiced by Shōzō Iizuka in Japan, Mike Kleinhenz in the English ADV dub and Steve Blum in the English Animaze dub.
Dhalsim is a monk who lives in a remote village in India. He is a practitioner of yoga who possesses many psychic abilities and predicted the eventual arrival of Ryu and Ken before either of them were even born. Sagat had earlier instructed Ryu to seek Dhalsim for advice about the Ways of Hadou. Ryu and Ken are initially turned down, with Dhalsim describing them as "beasts", but the monk changes his mind after seeing them overcome the challenges within the village temple. However, he was unsuccessful in training Ryu to use the Hadouken, which is inadvertently triggered in Ryu's body during a lesson.
 Vega
 Voiced by Kaneto Shiozawa in Japan, Vic Mignogna in the English ADV dub, and Richard Cansino in the English Animaze dub.
Vega's full name is Vega Fabio La Cerda (Balrog Fabio La Cerda in the Japanese version; his video game counterpart has no full name). He is a popular, aristocratic, and handsome matador who resides in a large mansion in Barcelona, where he moonlights as a cage fighter for rich socialites. He is noted for his sadistic, cold-hearted, ruthless personality; he is shown drinking his own blood, and the blood of his opponents. He is highly vain and lashes out in a violent rage at anyone who damages his face. When cage fighting, he wears an expressionless mask and wields a three-pronged claw gauntlet. During a bullfight attended by Ken, Ryu, and Chun-Li, Vega develops an obsession for Chun-Li, and plots to kill Ryu and Ken, whom he sees as rivals for her affections. Chun-Li is initially attracted to Vega but becomes terrified of him because of his sadistic tendencies. He breaks into her hotel and uses a "love potion" drug on her. While under its influence, she watches Vega and Ken fight each other in a steel cage at Vega's mansion. Although Ken defeats Vega, Ken nearly dies from the battle injuries. Vega's fate is not clearly shown. Weeks later, the mansion is investigated by Guile and Nash; it is completely abandoned, indicating that Vega is either still hospitalized or has fled. Unlike his in-game counterpart, Vega has no affiliation with Shadowlaw or M. Bison and the only signature move he uses is his Flying Barcelona Attack.
 Balrog
 Voiced by Tomomichi Nishimura in Japan, Werner Richmond in the English ADV dub, and Joe Romersa in the English Amimaze dub.
Balrog is an executive officer at Interpol who works for Shadowlaw as an informant. After an Interpol conference in which Inspector Dorai is appointed to head the investigation into Shadowlaw, Balrog hires Cammy and orders her to assassinate him, telling her that Interpol secretly ordered the hit and that Dorai is actually a double agent who replaces every drug cartel he shuts down with a new one, with himself as its leader. Suspicions are raised when it is suggested that only a senior Interpol officer would have been aware of his investigations into Shadowlaw. When it is revealed to Interpol that Dorai is still alive, Balrog orders Cammy to finish the job. She visits Dorai in his hospital room, where she is attacked by an enraged Fei Long and eventually captured. Balrog's secret is discovered by Fei Long (with the help of Cammy) after his cover story's inconsistencies are compared. Before being placed under arrest, Cammy takes revenge against Balrog for giving her fraudulent reasons for the assassination. Unlike his in-game portrayal, Balrog is highly intelligent, crafty, and even cowardly. Despite retaining his large build and intimidating stature, Balrog does not participate in any fights and only shows up in his boxing gear in the second version of the ending credits. He is known as M. Bison in the Japanese version.
 Cammy White
 Voiced by Yōko Sasaki in Japan, Carol Matthews, and Shawn Taylor in the English ADV dub and Debra Jean Rogers in the English Animaze dub.
Cammy White is a former agent of MI6 who now makes her living as a mercenary assassin. Being a devout Catholic, she always prays for forgiveness before and after each hit. She takes pride in her work, and believes that when she's hired for a job, the death of her target must come from her own hand and not as an accident or incidental occurrence, to the extent that she will even protect her target from harm until she is ready to strike. Also as a matter of pride, she refuses to act on false pretexts for employment. Cammy's costume design is drastically altered from her appearances in other media. She wears a black halter top, black leather pants, and a choker decorated with a crucifix which she uses to conceal a retractable metal wire to assassinate her victims. Her original costume with a beret and pigtails is briefly seen during her introduction in episode 17. Despite being British, Cammy speaks with an American accent. The signature moves that Cammy uses from the game are Cannon Spike, Spiral Arrow, Flying Neck Hunt, and an aerial version of her Spiral Arrow called the Sniping Heel.
 Zangief
 Voiced by Yasuro Tanaka in Japan, (ADV dub ?) and Kevin Seymour in the English Animaze dub.
Zangief is a Russian bear wrestler who works as one of Shadowlaw's strong men. He does not seem to have any particular desire or inclination to injure or kill anyone, although he's not above using his strength in full should his orders require him to do so. He wears a loincloth-like shirt, whereas in the games he appears in a speedo. He also works for Shadowlaw, though he was unaffiliated with them in the games. The only move that Zangief uses from the game is his Atomic Suplex.
 M. Bison
 Voiced by Kenji Utsumi in Japan, Markham Anderson and Mike Kleinhenz in the ADV English dub and Tom Wyner in the English Animaze dub.
M. Bison is the enigmatic head of Shadowlaw. In contrast to Ken and Ryu's Hadou (which is based in ki), Bison's powers are based on his rage and hatred, and are referred to as "Psycho Power". Usage of "Psycho Power" usually causes him to lose his ability to reason, and in one instance he nearly strangles Chun-Li to death only to regret his actions when he resumes his previous cognitive state. His goal is world domination, and most of his activities are financed through underground operations, such as the Ashura syndicate. It is suggested that much of his work may be the result of semi-telepathic influence originating from a silver idol in the form of an eagle's head. Unlike most characters in the show, Bison's personality, appearance, and backstory do not deviate much from his in-game portrayals, though his uniform, which resembles the original one he had in Street Fighter II: The World Warrior, has a swapped color-scheme. Bison has a variety of bases throughout the world, and the final battle against him takes place in Barcelona. He is known as Vega in the Japanese version.

Other characters
 Inspector Dorai
 Voiced by Rokuro Naya in Japan, John Swasey in the English ADV dub, and Michael Forest in the English Animaze dub.
Chun-Li's father, who was unnamed in the original games. He is the Vice Squad Captain for the Hong Kong Police Department and is routinely engaged in drug busts, sting operations, and various other police activities. His residence also functions as a temple and training ground where he teaches his daughter and several other students, including Fei Long. Following the successful bust of a large cocaine-smuggling operation and the subsequent arrest of the Ashura kingpin behind it, Inspector Dorai is called to Barcelona to attend an Interpol conference concerning the investigation of Shadowlaw. He is appointed to lead the investigation but is nearly killed by Cammy on the orders of a Shadowlaw infiltrator, Balrog. His survival is kept secret by the Chief of Interpol until the person who ordered the hit can be identified. Unlike his in-game counterpart, Dorai survives Shadowlaw's attack.
 Charlie Nash
 Voiced by Ryōichi Tanaka in Japan, Jay Hickman in the English ADV dub, and Dean Elliott in the English Animaze dub.
Charlie Nash is Guile's best friend, who has served alongside him in combat situations. Nash is murdered by Bison during the mission to rescue Ken, Ryu, and Chun-Li from Shadowlaw. Since the show was produced while Street Fighter Alpha: Warriors' Dreams was still under development, he bears no resemblance to his in-game counterpart. In the show, his appearance is similar to Jean Reno. While Nash is known as "Charlie" in the English localization of the games, Nash retains his Japanese name for the English dub of the show (except in one scene during episode 26, where Guile shouts out his name and calls him "Charlie" just before his death).
 Zoltar
 Voiced by Matsuo Matsuo in Japan, and Milton James in the English Animaze dub.
Zoltar is a loyal but spineless servant and chauffeur of M. Bison, who also holds secondary command over Shadowlaw. Zoltar appears to be one of M. Bison's top scientists, as it is he who informs M. Bison of the details regarding the microchips used to control Ryu and Chun-Li's minds. Zoltar usually does nothing more than remain at M. Bison's side, assists him in capturing evidence with a camera, and report several major occurrences to him. Zoltar plays a very similar role to Senoh from Street Fighter II: The Animated Movie, given that they are both Bison's top scientists who report directly to him, and are both voiced by Milton James in the U.S. dub.

Episodes

Music 

Japanese
 Opening Themes
 "Kaze Fuiteru" by Yuki Kuroda (eps 1–19)
 "Ima, ashita no tame ni" by Shuji Honda (eps 20–29)
 Ending Themes
 "Cry" by Yuki Kuroda (eps 1–19)
 "Lonely Baby" by Shuji Honda (eps. 20–29)

The American and Australian release of the Manga/Animaze English dub uses untitled instrumental theme music by Mike Egan composed specifically for the dub. The ADV Films version kept the original Japanese intro and outro themes.

Development
The work on the anime was influenced by Street Fighter II: The Animated Movie.

Media
Two English adaptations of the series were produced. The first one was by the dubbing group Animaze and Manga Entertainment in 1996, and was released in Australia and North America as a series of VHS tapes in 1997–1998. Each tape included three episodes, and was released in both a dubbed version and a subtitled version (which was priced 5 US dollars more than the dubbed version). In 1997, ADV Films produced a second English dub exclusively for the UK market, also released on VHS. The Animaze/Manga dub had a DVD release on 29 April 2003 in a four disc set in North America and was then released on DVD in Australia.

In Japan, the anime was released via DVD box set on July 15, 2009.

Notes

References

External links 
 
 

1995 anime television series debuts
1995 manga
Adventure anime and manga
Anime television series based on video games
Group TAC
Kodansha manga
Martial arts anime and manga
Shōnen manga
V
Martial arts television series
V
Television shows set in San Francisco
Television shows set in Japan
Television shows set in Hong Kong
Television shows set in Thailand
Television shows set in India
Television shows set in Spain
Terrorism in fiction
Yomiuri Telecasting Corporation original programming
Television series set in 1995